Choudhry Inayatullah (born 1922) was a Pakistani senior journalist. He was the Founder Editor of Daily Mashriq .

References 

1922 births
Possibly living people
Journalists from Lahore
Pakistani male journalists